Bruce Armistead Smathers (born October 3, 1943) is a retired Democratic politician from Florida. He served as the 18th Secretary of State of Florida from 1975 to 1978.

Political career 
Smathers began his political career in 1972, when he was elected to the Florida Senate from the 9th District, representing most of Duval County.

In 1974, he was elected Secretary of State. Once in office, Smathers reformed election laws, modernized the Division of Corporations, became involved in the "Atocha" treasure dispute, expanded support for cultural affairs, and was best known as leader of the successful effort to preserve Florida's Old Capitol (1845–1978). At the time he took office, he was the youngest member of the Florida Cabinet in the twentieth century.

In July 1978, Smathers resigned to campaign for governor. He lost in the Democratic primary to Bob Graham.

Family and background 
He is the younger son of George Smathers, former Congressman and U.S. Senator for Florida.  After attending the St. Alban's School, Smathers earned an undergraduate degree in Economics from Yale University (with honors) and a law degree from University of Florida (Florida Blue Key and Florida Law Review). A NROTC graduate, Smathers was commissioned as an Ensign in the United States Navy. Smathers received assignment to Naval Amphibious Base Coronado and subsequently completed Underwater Demolition Training Replacement Accession (UDTRA) training class 36, now known as BUD/S training. Smathers was assigned to Underwater Demolition Team Eleven (UDT-11), served with Naval Special Warfare Pacific, and was a decorated Vietnam War Veteran. After his political career, he combined law with lobbying, running family orange and automobile businesses, and became a successful investor serving on various private and charitable boards.

He presently resides between Jacksonville, Ponte Vedra Beach, and Cordillera, Colorado. He and his wife, Susan Gamble, have one son, Bruce, Jr.

College relations
Smathers was college roommates with two different members of Congress. Smathers roomed with U.S. Senator Bill Nelson during undergraduate studies at Yale University. Smathers roomed with Congressman Ander Crenshaw while studying at the University of Florida College of Law.

References

External links

|-

1943 births
Living people
Secretaries of State of Florida
Fredric G. Levin College of Law alumni
Florida state senators
St. Albans School (Washington, D.C.) alumni
Yale University alumni